The Acba bank was established in 1996, within TACIS program of the European Union. It is the biggest bank in Armenia for agriculture financing, especially in rural areas. It has 57 branches country-wide and had its IPO in 2021.

See also

Armenian dram
Economy of Armenia
List of banks in Armenia

References

Banks of Armenia